Colma di Mombarone (or simply Mombarone) is a mountain of the Biellese Alps, a sub-range of Pennine Alps, in northern Italy. It visually marks, along with Monte Gregorio on the opposite side, the entrance of Aosta Valley from the Po plain. On its top in 1900 was built a huge statue, still located there, of Jesus Christ.

Etymology 
The name comes from Piedmontese language: Colma is a term used in the northern Piedmont and referring to a pass or a high place, while Mombarone is the italianisation of the piedmontese Monbaron, where mon is for mount and baron means heap or pile.

Geography 
The mountain is located between Dora Baltea and Cervo valleys, on the border between Province of Turin and province of Biella, both in Piemonte region. Administratively it is divided between the comunes of Settimo Vittone (in the province of Turin), Donato and Graglia (both in the province of Biella).

SOIUSA classification 
According to the SOIUSA (International Standardized Mountain Subdivision of the Alps) the mountain can be classified in the following way:
 main part = Western Alps
 major sector = North Western Alps
 section = Pennine Alps
 subsection = Southern  Valsesia Alps
 supergroup = Alpi Biellesi
 group = Catena Tre Vescovi - Mars
 subgroup =
 code = I/B-9.IV-A.1

Access to the summit
 
The easiest routes for the summit are two long but well marked footpaths, one starting from San Giacomo di Andrate (TO) and another from San Carlo di Graglia (BI); both of them converge on the southern ridge of the mountain.
Nearby the mountain's top, at 2,312  m, is located Rifugio Mombarone, a permanent mountain hut.

Maps
 Italian official cartography (Istituto Geografico Militare - IGM); on-line version: www.pcn.minambiente.it
 Provincia di Biella cartography: Carta dei sentieri della Provincia di Biella, 1:25.00 scale, 2004; on line version:  webgis.provincia.biella.it

References
 

Mombarone
Mombarone
Two-thousanders of Italy
Graglia